Oxford Brookes University Boat Club (known as Brookes especially verbally and as OBUBC in formal print) is the rowing club of Oxford Brookes University, England. The club has been very successful at pre-training and co-training many Olympic competitors including those for Great Britain who won 6 golds at Olympics spread across three consecutive games, starting with the games of 2000.

From 1995 into 2007, inclusive, Brookes won its record 13 consecutive British Universities Sport Association (annual BUSA games) men's eight wins.

History
The club was founded in 1978 as the Oxford Polytechnic Boat Club (OPBC) where it was given its first home with Oxford Falcon Rowing and Canoeing Club and begun to enter competitions as a composite Polytechnic/Falcon crew. In the 2020 work The Umpires' Handbook the blade colours of the club are: burgundy, navy & cream, as is the kit. Due to the rarity of two of these colours the cream is in some kit and/or blades left as white and the burgundy (13% blue, 50% red) made up as maroon.

Path to a 1993 Henley Royal Regatta cup
In 1981, OPBC made its first qualification to Henley Royal Regatta (HRR). The crew was knocked out in the first round of The Ladies Challenge Plate  The club geared up in equipment, facilities, its student appeal, scholarships and coaching by 2000. The first win for the men at HRR being the Temple Challenge Cup in 1993.

2000 to 2008 Olympians
2000 marked the first Olympic success of a chunk of the men's squad: Ben Hunt-Davis, Fred Scarlett and Rowley Douglas won gold medals in the Men's Eights at Sydney. Steve Williams achieved gold at the World Championships, along with Alex Partridge who won 23 gold.

Williams went on to win gold at the Athens Olympics and did so four years later. He won a World Championship event in 2005 with Partidge.

In the 2008 Beijing Olympics Alastair Heathcote, Tom Lucy and Partridge won silver. Carla Ashford and Caroline O'Connor powered into fifth in the final of the women's eight.

2009 to date, highlights
In 2009, Brookes beat Yale to the Prince Albert Challenge Cup at HRR.

Partridge gained a bronze in the M.

In 2014, Brookes brought HRR's Temple back to Britain for the first time since 2006, winning against the freshmen crew from Browen. They repeated this two years later – atoning their narrow quarter-final loss in 2015 (deemed 'the Temple final on the Friday') to eventual winners A.S.R. Nereus (of the Netherlands) – by beating the 2V crew from Harvard.

In 2017, Brookes went one step further again – after setting a new course record in Ghent, as well as a domestic national record of 5:30 at Eton Dorney. They won the Temple with an entirely new crew. Thus they won for the third year in four, and snatched the Ladies' Challenge Plate (for men) with the 2016 crew. This particular double at HRR was a first for any university boat club.

In 2021, the club won the blue riband event at the HRR, the Grand Challenge Cup. They won five other events: the Ladies', Stewards', Silver Goblets, the Island and the Visitors'.

Boat House
The Oxford Brookes New Boat House sits on a 10 km stretch of the River Thames that is classed as one of the best non-tidal stretches of water in the country. This length, width and quality of the water has been a key factor in Brookes' success, allowing both men's and women's crews to train together, in an enjoyable but highly competitive environment.

In June 2013 marked the opening of the new boat house on the thames designed by architects Spratley Studios. The vision was to expand and update an outgrown, outdated building to produce a state-of-the-art facility, fit to support the demands of World and Olympic medallists and create an environment in which top-class athletes can shine. The contemporary interpretation of local agricultural buildings, compliant with stringent environmental and ecological benchmarks, underpins the concept. The simplistic gable form echoes a resplendent Tithe Barn on the banks of the Thames, a discreet silhouette within the landscape.

The new facilities include land-based training areas, extra boat storage and large changing rooms.

Taurus Boat Club
Taurus Boat Club is the Alumni club of Oxford Brookes University. The Taurus Boat Club is for past oarsmen and oarswomen that were former alumni of Oxford Polytechnic & Oxford Brookes University with the allowance of current Brookes welcomed to join. Taurus won the Britannia Challenge Cup at Henley Royal Regatta in 2013.

Honours

British champions

Key = 2, 4, 8 (crew size), x (sculls), - (coxless), + (coxed)

Henley Royal Regatta

See also
Oxford Brookes University
University rowing (UK)
Rowing on the River Thames

References

External links
Oxford Brookes University Boat Club website
Brookes Sport website
Taurus Boat Club

History of rowing
Rowing clubs in England
University and college rowing clubs in the United Kingdom
Rowing clubs in Oxfordshire
Rowing clubs of the River Thames